Platylobium infecundum  is a  shrub species  that is endemic to Victoria, Australia. It is a member of the family Fabaceae and of the genus Platylobium. The species was first formally described in 2011. The type specimen was collected from Heathmont.

References

infecundum
Fabales of Australia
Flora of Victoria (Australia)
Plants described in 2011